Danny Bakker (born 25 January 1995) is a Dutch footballer who plays as a midfielder for Derde Divisie club VVSB.

Club career
Bakker is a graduate of Ajax's youth academy. On 11 August 2014, he made his professional debut for Jong Ajax in an Eerste Divisie match against Telstar, replacing Lerin Duarte on 80 minutes.

References

External links
 

1995 births
Living people
Sportspeople from Amstelveen
Association football midfielders
Dutch footballers
Jong Ajax players
SC Cambuur players
FC Dordrecht players
Eerste Divisie players
Tweede Divisie players
VVSB players
Footballers from North Holland